Yonam Institute of Technology, also Yonam Engineering College, is a private technical college located in Jinju, South Gyeongsang province, South Korea.  It offers courses in computer electronics, hardware design, industrial information design, and related fields.

Sister colleges

Within South Korea, the Yonam Institute maintains sisterhood relationships with Cheonan Yonam College, which was also established by the Yonam Educational Foundation.  Internationally, it has relations with seven schools in seven countries:  Canberra Institute of Technology in Australia, Changchun Institute of Technology in China, the Fachhochschule Augsburg in Germany, Nippon Bunri University in Japan, Northumbria University in the United Kingdom, St. John's and St. Mary's Institute of Technology in Taiwan, and Laguardia Community College in the United States.

See also
List of colleges and universities in South Korea
Education in South Korea

External links
Official school website, in Korean

Universities and colleges in South Gyeongsang Province